Aas ("Hope") is a Pakistani drama television serial on TV One. It features Mirza Zain Baig, Hajra Yamin, Arslan Asad Butt, Shehryar Zaidi, Humaira Bano, Kinza Malik, Sajid Shah, and Omi Butt in pivotal roles. The serial began on TV One from 4 October 2019, and airs on Friday. After Episode 25, which aired on 20 March 2020, further episodes aired after a gap of several weeks.

Overview
The story revolves around Safeer, who is the son of middle-class family, and Hania, who is the daughter of a very rich family. Both by fate meet and fall in love with each other.

A powerful story about an honest, idealistic young man in search of a job so he can marry his beloved. And the forces of greed and intrigue that are determined to block him.

Cast
Mirza Zain Baig as Safeer
Hajra Yamin as Hania
Humaira Bano
Arslan Asad Butt as Rizwan
Omi Butt as Afzal
Shehryar Zaidi as Naseem
Kinza Malik as Atiya
Sajid Shah as Nadir
Sajida Syed
Ayesha Toor

International release
The series is available for streaming under the title "The Yearning" on Hilal Play.

References

External links 
 

Pakistani drama television series
2019 Pakistani television series debuts
2020 Pakistani television series endings
Urdu-language television shows
TVOne Pakistan